Iisalmen serkku ja muita kertomuksia (Finnish: The Cousin from Iisalmi and Other Tales) is a 1996 collection of historical literary works by Finnish author Kaari Utrio. The book includes the following seven works:
 Iisalmen serkku ("Cousin from Iisalmi", a novella)
 Luisa (a novella)
 Agneta rakastuu ("Agneta Falls in Love")
 Rakas Thea ("Dear Thea")
 Ihana köyhyys ("Lovely Poorness")
 Ruusukupit ("Rose Cups")
 Rautalilja ("Iron Lily", a republished novel)

References

1996 novels
Novels by Kaari Utrio
Tammi (company) books
20th-century Finnish novels
Finnish historical novels
Finnish short story collections
Novels set in the 19th century
1996 short story collections